Beli is a Torricelli language of Papua New Guinea. It is also known as Akuwagel, Makarim, Mukili.

It is spoken in Mukili, Makapim
, and other villages of Maimai Wanwan Rural LLG in Nuku District, Sandaun Province.

Notes

Maimai languages
Languages of Sandaun Province